Junctional adhesion molecule B is a protein that in humans is encoded by the JAM2 gene. JAM2 has also been designated as CD322 (cluster of differentiation 322).

Function 

Tight junctions represent one mode of cell-to-cell adhesion in endothelial cell sheets, forming continuous seals around cells and serving as a physical barrier to prevent solutes and water from passing freely through the paracellular space. The protein encoded by this immunoglobulin superfamily gene member is localized in the tight junctions between high endothelial cells. It acts as an adhesive ligand for interacting with a variety of immune cell types and may play a role in lymphocyte homing to secondary lymphoid organs.

It is purported to promote lymphocyte transendothelial migration. It might also be involved with endothelial cell polarity, by associating to cell polarity protein PAR-3, together with JAM3.

Interactions 

JAM2 has been shown to interact with PARD3.

It also interacts with the integrin dimer VLA-4 (also called α4β1).

References

Further reading

External links
 
 

Clusters of differentiation